The 2022–23 season is the 99th season in the history of Rayo Vallecano and their second consecutive season in the top flight. In addition to the league, the club participated in the Copa del Rey, losing in the Round of 32 to second division side Sporting Gijón.

Players

First-team squad

Reserve team

Out on loan

Transfers

In

Out

Pre-season and friendlies

Competitions

Overall record

La Liga

League table

Results summary

Results by round

Matches 
The league fixtures were announced on 23 June 2022.

Copa del Rey

References

Rayo Vallecano seasons
Rayo Vallecano